The Cheese and the Worms is a scholarly work by the Italian historian Carlo Ginzburg, published in 1976. The book is a notable example of cultural history, the history of mentalities and microhistory. It is "probably the most popular and widely read work of microhistory".

The study examines the unique religious beliefs and cosmogony of Menocchio (1532–1599), also known as Domenico Scandella, who was an Italian miller from the village of Montereale, twenty-five kilometers north of Pordenone. He was from the peasant class, and not a learned aristocrat or man of letters; Ginzburg places him in the tradition of popular culture and pre-Christian naturalistic peasant religions. Due to his outspoken beliefs he was declared a heresiarch (heretic) and burned at the stake during the Roman Inquisition.

Menocchio's life

Education and cultural horizon 
Menocchio's literacy may be accounted for by the establishment of schools in the villages surrounding Friuli: Aviano and Pordenone. A school was opened at the beginning of the sixteenth century under the direction of Girolamo Amaseo for, "reading and teaching, without exception, children of citizens as well as those artisans and the lower classes, old as well as young, without payment." It is possible that Menocchio attended a school such as this. He began to read some books available in his locality and began to reinterpret the Bible.

No complete list exists of the books that Menocchio might have read which influenced his view of the cosmos. At the time of his arrest several books were found, but since they were not prohibited, no record was taken. Based on Menocchio's first trial these books are known to have been read:

1. The Bible in the vernacular
2. Il Fioretto della Bibbia (a translation of a medieval Catalan chronicle compiled from various sources)
3. Il Lucidario della Madonna, by the Dominican Albert da Castello
4. Il Lucendario de santi, by Jacopo da Voragine (see Golden Legend)
5. Historia del giudicio (anonymous fifteenth-century poem)
6. Il cavallier Zuanne de Mandavilla (an Italian translation of the book of travels attributed to Sir John Mandeville)
7. A book called Zampollo (Il sogno dil Caravia)

Based on the testimony from Menocchio's second trial these books also are known to have been read:

8. Il supplimento della cronache
9. Lunario al modo di Italia calculato composto nella citta di Pesaro dal. ecc. mo dottore Marino Camilo de Leonardis
10. the Decameron of Boccaccio
11. an unidentified book believed to be an Italian translation of the Quran

Many of these books were loaned to Menocchio and were common at the time. Knowing how Menocchio read and interpreted these texts might provide insight into his views which led to his execution for proselytizing heretical ideas.

Argument

During the preliminary questioning, Menocchio spoke freely because he felt he had done nothing wrong. It is in this hearing that he explained his cosmology about "the cheese and the worms", the title of Carlo Ginzburg's microhistory of Menocchio and source of much that is known of this 16th-century miller.
Menocchio said: "I have said that, in my opinion, all was chaos, that is, earth, air, water, and fire were mixed together; and out of that bulk a mass formed – just as cheese is made out of milk – and worms appeared in it, and these were the angels. The most holy majesty decreed that these should be God and the angels, and among that number of angels there was also God, he too having been created out of that mass at the same time, and he was named lord with four captains, Lucifer, Michael, Gabriel, and Raphael. That Lucifer sought to make himself lord equal to the king, who was the majesty of God, and for this arrogance God ordered him driven out of heaven with all his host and his company; and this God later created Adam and Eve and people in great number to take the places of the angels who had been expelled. And as this multitude did not follow God's commandments, he sent his Son, whom the Jews seized, and he was crucified."

Menocchio had a "tendency to reduce religion to morality", using this as justification for his blasphemy during his trial because he believed that the only sin was to harm one's neighbor and that to blaspheme caused no harm to anyone but the blasphemer.  He went so far as to say that Jesus was born of man and Mary was not a virgin, that the Pope had no power given to him from God (but simply exemplified the qualities of a good man), and that Christ had not died to "redeem humanity". Warned to denounce his ways and uphold the beliefs of the Roman Catholic Church by both his inquisitors and his family, Menocchio returned to his village. Because of his nature, he was unable to cease speaking about his theological ideas with those who would listen. He had originally attributed his ideas to "diabolical inspiration" and the influence of the devil before admitting that he had simply thought up the ideas himself.

See also 
The Night Battles (1966) by Ginzburg
The Great Cat Massacre (1984) by Robert Darnton

References

Further reading

 First published in Italian as Il formaggio e I vermi, 1976.
L'Orient du XVIe siècle by Yvelise Bernard, Paris 1988,  ; a short annotated biography of Guillaume Postel pp. 31–37.

External links 
Putting the Inquisition on Trial, Los Angeles Times, April 17, 1998
Review in the Journal of Peasant Studies (1983)
Menocchio's Place in History (1991)

History books about Italy
1976 non-fiction books
Anthropology books
Counter-Reformation